Strapatsada (Greek: στραπατσάδα) is a popular dish in many regions of Greece, especially the Ionian Islands, due to the availability and low cost of its ingredients (fresh tomatoes, eggs and olive oil). It is often prepared "on the spot" and served for lunch or a light snack; however, it can also be served cold.  The dish is also known as kagianas, koskosela (in Cyclades) or menemeni.

Preparing strapatsada is quick and easy: the chopped or pureed tomatoes are cooked in a frying pan with olive oil and pepper until they become a thick sauce. The beaten eggs are then added and stirred to a boil. Feta cheese can optionally be added just before turning off the heat (salt is usually not necessary if feta is used). Oregano, thyme or other dried herbs can be used as seasoning.

The dish is especially popular in the summer, when fresh tomatoes abound. The name comes from the Italian word "strapazzare" which means breaking an egg and mix it all while cooking.

See also
Shakshouka
Scrambled eggs
Piperade
Menemen (food)
Huevos rancheros

References

Greek cuisine
Egg dishes
Tomato dishes